This article outlines the 2000 season for the British rugby league club Wigan Warriors. This season saw them compete in the Super League and Challenge Cup.

League table

Source:

Play-offs

Cup Run

Source:

References

Wigan Warriors seasons